Joe Newman with Woodwinds is a 1958 album by trumpeter Joe Newman, featuring members of the Count Basie Orchestra. It was originally released on the Roulette label.

Reception

AllMusic awarded the album 3 stars.

Track listing
 "Star Eyes" (Gene de Paul, Don Raye) - 3:23
 "Speak Low" (Kurt Weill, Ogden Nash) - 2:07
 "Time" (Felice Bryant, Boudleaux Bryant) - 2:20
 "Baby, Won't You Please Come Home" (Charles Warfield, Clarence Williams) - 2:54
 "You're My Thrill" (Jay Gorney, Sidney Clare) - 2:38
 "Travelin' Light" (Trummy Young, Jimmy Mundy, Johnny Mercer) - 2:19
 "That Old Devil Moon" (Burton Lane, Yip Harburg) - 1:53
 "Lover Man" (Jimmy Davis, Ram Ramirez, James Sherman) - 3:10
 "Out of Nowhere" (Johnny Green, Edward Heyman) - 2:29
 "Nancy" (Jimmy Van Heusen, Phil Silvers) - 3:12
 "My Old Flame" (Arthur Johnston, Sam Coslow) - 3:11
 "I'll Get By" (Fred E. Ahlert, Roy Turk) - 2:14

Personnel 
Joe Newman - trumpet
Marshal Royal - alto saxophone, clarinet
Jerry Sanfino, Frank Wess - tenor saxophone, flute
George Berg - tenor saxophone, clarinet
Romeo Penque - tenor saxophone, flute, oboe
Charlie Fawlkes - baritone saxophone, bass clarinet
Freddie Green - guitar
Jimmie Jones - piano
Eddie Jones - bass
Charlie Persip, Ed Shaughnessy - drums
Ernie Wilkins - arranger

References 

1958 albums
Joe Newman (trumpeter) albums
Roulette Records albums
Albums produced by Teddy Reig
Albums arranged by Ernie Wilkins